Inside with Chris Cuomo is an American documentary series hosted by Chris Cuomo. The series documents Chris in social issues in U.S. cities from an insider perspective. Announced in March 2017 under the working title Inside Secret Places with Chris Cuomo, the series' five-episode first season premiered on HLN on October 20, 2017.

Episodes

References 

2010s American documentary television series
2017 American television series debuts